Prespes is a municipality in the Florina regional unit, Western Macedonia, Greece. Its population in 2011 was 7,380. The seat of the municipality is in Laimos. It was named after Lake Prespa, in the western part of the municipality.

Municipality
The municipality was formed at the 2011 local government reform by the merger of the former municipalities of Krystallopigi and Prespes, that became municipal units.

The municipality has an area of 515.497 km2, the municipal unit 413.513 km2. According to the 2011 Greek census, Prespes was the least densely populated municipality in the country, with an average of 3.05 residents per square kilometre, and also the smallest municipality, by population size, of the Florina regional unit.

References

Further reading
 Δημήτρις Πένης, Πρέσπα η Ελληνική, 2007

Municipalities of Western Macedonia
Populated places in Florina (regional unit)